Colliander is a surname. Notable people with the surname include:

Hans Colliander (1924–2013), Swedish diplomat
James Colliander (born 1967), American-Canadian mathematician
Rafael Colliander (1878–1938), Finnish journalist and politician
Sven Colliander (1890–1961), Swedish Army officer and horse rider 
Tito Colliander (1904–1989), Finnish Eastern Orthodox Christian writer